Project Genie was a computer research project started in 1964 at the University of California, Berkeley. 
It produced an early time-sharing system including the Berkeley Timesharing System, which was then commercialized as the SDS 940.

History
Project Genie was funded by J. C. R. Licklider, the head of ARPA's Information Processing Techniques Office at that time.  The project was a smaller counterpart to MIT's Project MAC.

The Scientific Data Systems SDS 940 was created by modifying an SDS 930 24-bit commercial computer so that it could be used for timesharing. The work was funded by ARPA and directed by Melvin W. Pirtle and Wayne Lichtenberger at UC Berkeley. Butler Lampson, Chuck Thacker, and L. Peter Deutsch were among the young technical leaders of that project.  When completed and in service, the first 940 ran reliably in spite of its array of tricky mechanical issues such as a huge disk drive driven by hydraulic arms. It served about forty or fifty users at a time and still managed to drive a graphics subsystem that was quite capable for its time. 

When SDS realized the value of the time sharing system, and that the software was in the public domain (funded by the US federal government), they came back to Berkeley and collected enough information to begin manufacturing. Because  SDS manufacturing was overloaded with the 9 series production and the startup of the Sigma Series production, it could not incorporate the 940 modifications into the standard production line.  Instead, production of the 940s  was turned over to the Systems Engineering Department, which manufactured systems customised to user requirements.  To produce a 940, the Systems Engineering Department ordered a 930 from SDS manufacturing, installed the modifications developed by the Berkeley engineers, and shipped machine to the SDS customer as a 940.

Project Genie pioneered several computer hardware techniques, such as commercial time-sharing which allowed end-user programming in machine language, separate protected user modes, memory paging, and protected memory. Concepts from Project Genie influenced the development of the TENEX operating system for the PDP-10, and Unix, which inherited the concept of process forking from it (Unix co-creator Ken Thompson worked on an SDS 940 while at Berkeley).  An SDS 940 mainframe was used by Douglas Engelbart's OnLine System at the Stanford Research Institute and was the first computer used by the Community Memory Project at Berkeley.

In 1968, Lampson also helped design a different timesharing system at Berkeley: Cal TSS for the CDC 6400 with Extended Core Storage. Lampson was only involved until 1969, but Cal TSS continued until 1971.
Several members of project Genie such as Pirtle, Thacker, Deutsch and Lampson left UCB to form the Berkeley Computer Corporation (BCC), which produced one prototype, the BCC-500.
After BCC went bankrupt after its funding from the computer mainframe lessor Data Processing Financial & General (DPF&G) suddenly stopped, the BCC-500 was transferred to the University of Hawaii, where it continued in use through the 1970s. It became part of the ALOHAnet.

Several BCC employees became the core of Xerox PARC's computer research group (Deutsch, Lampson and Thacker) in 1970. Lichtenberger went to the University of Hawaii, and was an early employee at Cisco Systems.

Pirtle became technical director for the ILLIAC IV project at NASA Ames Research Center.

See also
DARPA
Berkeley Timesharing System
Timeline of operating systems

References

External links
Project Genie Documentation

DARPA
1964 establishments in California
University of California, Berkeley
Time-sharing